Scott Bowman  is an England-born Australian academic.

Originally working in England as a radiographer, Bowman was a principal lecturer at London South Bank University before becoming a dean at St Martin's College.

After relocating to Australia, Bowman served in various executive roles at Charles Sturt University, the University of South Australia, and James Cook University.

Bowman served as vice-chancellor of Central Queensland University from 2009 until his retirement in 2018.

Bowman holds a master's degree in politics and business administration and a PhD in clinical decision making.

In recognition of his service to higher education in Australia, Bowman was appointed as an Officer of the Order of Australia in the 2019 Queen's Birthday Honours.

On 18 February 2021, Bowman was announced as the new Vice-Chancellor of Charles Darwin University.

References 

Radiographers
British emigrants to Australia
Academics of London South Bank University
Academic staff of Charles Sturt University
Academic staff of James Cook University
Academic staff of the University of South Australia
Academic staff of Central Queensland University
Officers of the Order of Australia
Living people
Year of birth missing (living people)